The Kyrgyzstani records in swimming are the fastest ever performances of swimmers from Kyrgyzstan, which are recognised and ratified by the Kyrgyz Republic Swimming Federation.

All records were set in finals unless noted otherwise.

Long Course (50 m)

Men

Women

Short Course (25 m)

Men

Women

References

Kyrgyzstan
Records
Swimming
Swimming